Denizli may refer to:

People
 Mustafa Denizli (born 1949), former Turkish football player and coach

Places
 Denizli, growing industrial city in the Southwestern part of Turkey
 Denizli Atatürk Stadium, multi-purpose stadium in Denizli, Turkey
 Denizli Çardak Airport, airport located in Çardak, Denizli Province, Turkey
 Denizli Province, province of Turkey in Western Anatolia
 Denizli, Cyprus
 Denizli, Sungurlu
 Denizli, Keban

Sports clubs
 Denizli B.S.K., TFF Second League team
 Denizlispor, sports club based in Denizli, Turkey

Turkish-language surnames